Pentagram is the debut studio album by Norwegian black metal band Gorgoroth, released in September 1994 by Embassy Productions. It followed the band's two demo cassettes, A Sorcery Written in Blood and Promo '94. It was the only album to feature Samoth on bass and Goat Pervertor on drums.

Reissues
Pentagram was reissued eight times, four of those on CD: in 1996 by Malicious Records, in 1999 by Century Black in America, in 2005 as a remastered version on Season of Mist and in 2007 on Regain Records. It was reissued four times on 12" vinyl: by Malicious Records in 1996 (limited to 500 copies), by Agonia Records in 2005 (limited to 1000 copies), in 2006 by Back on Black Records, and in 2016 by Soulseller Records.

Track listing

Personnel 
 Hat – vocals
 Infernus – guitar
Additional personnel
 Samoth – bass guitar
 Goat Pervertor – drums

Promo '94 

Promo '94 is the second demo by Gorgoroth. It was independently released in 1994 on cassette, and featured raw mixes of two tracks from Pentagram.

Track listing 
 "Katharinas bortgang" – 3:57
 "Måneskyggens slave" – 5:47

Personnel 
 Hat – vocals
 Infernus – guitar
Additional personnel
 Samoth – bass guitar
 Goat Pervertor – drums

References

Gorgoroth albums
1994 debut albums
Season of Mist albums